The Kurşunlu Waterfall is located 19 km from Antalya, Turkey at the end of a 7 km road branching off to the north of the Antalya-Serik-Alanya highway at a point 12 km east of Antalya. It is reduced to a mere trickle in the summer months.

The waterfall is on one of the tributaries of the Aksu River, where the tributary drops from Antalya's plateau to the coastal plain. It is situated in the midst of a pine forest of exceptional beauty, and the environs provide a picnic and pleasure spot about twenty minutes by car from the centre of the city of Antalya.

All year round, safari tours with all-terrain vehicles are being organized near the waterfall.

References

External links
Antalya and Waterfalls
How to go to Kursunlu Waterfall Nature Park
A set of pictures of the park

Waterfalls of Turkey
Tourist attractions in Antalya Province
Nature parks in Turkey
Landforms of Antalya Province
Protected areas established in 1991
1991 establishments in Turkey